Mati Erelt (born 12 March 1941) is an Estonian linguist.

Mati Erelt was born in Tallinn. In 1965 he graduated from the University of Tartu with a degree in Estonian language and literature. He defended his doctoral dissertation there in 1981.

From 1989 until 1991 he was a professor at Tallinn Pedagogical Institute (now, Tallinn University). From 1991 to 1995 he was a visiting professor at the Chair of Finno-Ugric Languages ​​at the University of Helsinki, and from 1995 to 2006. he was a professor at the Chair of Estonian at the University of Tartu. He is currently Professor Emeritus at the University of Tartu and continues to work as a Senior Research Fellow.

From 1997 until 2006 he was the chairman of Mother Tongue Society.

He is married to linguist Tiiu Erelt.

Awards
 2005: Order of the White Star, IV class
 2006: Medal of Estonian Academy of Sciences
 2006: Big Medal of Tartu University
 2008: Wiedemann Language Award

References

Living people
1941 births
Linguists from Estonia
University of Tartu alumni
Academic staff of the University of Tartu
Academic staff of Tallinn University
Recipients of the Order of the White Star, 4th Class
People from Tallinn